The anterior sacroiliac ligament consists of numerous thin bands, which connect the anterior surface of the lateral part of the sacrum to the margin of the auricular surface of the ilium and to the preauricular sulcus.

See also
Posterior sacroiliac ligament

References

External links
 

Ligaments of the torso
Ligaments